Guillermo González Zayas (born 15 January 1950) is a Puerto Rican sprinter. He competed in the men's 100 metres at the 1972 Summer Olympics.

References

1950 births
Living people
Athletes (track and field) at the 1972 Summer Olympics
Puerto Rican male sprinters
Olympic track and field athletes of Puerto Rico
Athletes (track and field) at the 1971 Pan American Games
Pan American Games competitors for Puerto Rico
Place of birth missing (living people)